KAIG may refer to:

 KAIG (FM), a radio station (89.9 FM) in Dodge City, Kansas United States
 Langlade County Airport, an airport near Antigo, Wisconsin, assigned the ICAO code KAIG